Mian Deh (also Romanized as Mīān Deh; also known as Mīān Deh-e Bālā and Mīāndeh-e ‘Olyā) is a village in Dowlatabad Rural District, in the Central District of Jiroft County, Kerman Province, Iran. At the 2006 census, its population was 968, in 226 families.

References 

Populated places in Jiroft County